Diaphus lucidus, the spotlight lanternfish, is a species of lanternfish 
found worldwide.

Size

References

Myctophidae
Taxa named by Tarleton Hoffman Bean
Taxa named by George Brown Goode
Fish described in 1896